Bien Unido, officially the Municipality of Bien Unido,  is a 4th class municipality in the province of Bohol, Philippines. According to the 2020 census, it has a population of 26,666 people.

Bien Unido is the youngest municipality in Bohol being founded in 1981 after it was carved out and separated from the municipalities of Trinidad and Talibon. Among the principal industries in Bien Unido are rice farming, seaweed farming, livestock raising, algaculture, fishing, and mat weaving. The town gained the nickname as the de facto Seaweeds Capital of the Visayas.

The "Bien Unido Double Barrier Reef Marine Park" is the first underwater pilgrimage in Asia, established in 2012. It is situated along the Danajon Bank.

The town of Bien Unido, Bohol celebrates its feast on December 28, to honor the town patron, the Holy Child.

History 

"Bien Unido" is a Spanish phrase translating to "well united" in English.

In 1935, two sitios in northern Trinidad were united into one barangay under an executive order and was given the name Bien Unido.

Then-Barangay Bien Unido had aspired to become a separate municipality since 1965. On December 24, 1980, Batas Pambansa Blg. 93 was passed, providing for the creation of the municipality of Bien Unido comprising the barangay of Bien Unido and certain surrounding barangays in the municipalities of Talibon and Trinidad. The creation of the municipality was approved by the majority of voters in a plebiscite on April 7, 1981.

On June 7, 2017, Gisela Bendong-Boniel, mayor of Bien Unido at that time, was kidnapped and killed, allegedly masterminded by her husband, Board Member Niño Rey Boniel, who was the former mayor of the town. Her body was dumped between the waters of Olango Island Group and Mactan. Her body has never been found.

Geography
Bien Unido is located in the northern part of the island province of Bohol.

Barangays 
Bien Unido comprises 15 barangays including the island barangays. Of these, only Bilangbilangan Diot and Hingotanan East are classified as rural and the rest are urban.

Climate

Demographics 

The people in the municipality speak Cebuano and the Boholano dialect. Filipino and English are generally understood.

Economy 

Fishes caught are brought and sold in Cebu while mats have markets in Mindanao, Leyte and Cebu.

Seaweed industry is recently the main livelihood in the municipality. The farmed seaweeds are used as essential ingredient for gel capsules, soap, toothpaste, slippers and other plastic wares.

Transportation 

Cebu City is approximately over 4 hours via the Cebu–Talibon and Cebu–Tubigon RORO routes, while it takes 3 hours via the Cebu–Tubigon ferry (fastcraft) and over 2 hours via the Cebu–Talibon ferry (fastcraft).

Moreover, it takes approximately 2 or 3 hours to reach Bien Unido via the Cebu–Getafe ferry (fastcraft) or motor boat, while it takes 3 hours via the Cebu–Getafe RORO.

Bien Unido can also be reached directly from Cebu City through Pasil-Suba fish port via pump boat in more than 3 hours.

Health and social services 
 Number of Municipal Health Center: 1
 Number of Barangay Health Stations: 7
 Number of Day Care Centers: 15

Education 

Secondary and High schools:
 Bien Unido Academy Inc. 
 Holy Child Academy of Bien Unido, Bohol Inc. 
 Hingotanan National High School
 Pres. Carlos P. Garcia Tech Voc School of Fisheries and Arts
 Ponciano L. Padin National High School
 Nueva Esperanza Integrated School

Elementary schools:

 Bien Unido Central Elementary School
 Bilangbilangan Daku Elementary School
 Hingotanan Elementary School
 Malingin Elementary School
 Mandawa Elementary School
 Maomawan Elementary School
 Montessori Educational Learning Centre of Ubay, Bien Unido Branch 
 Nueva Esperanza Integrated School
 Nueva Estrella Elementary School
 Pinamgo Elementary School
 Sagasa Elementary School

References

External links 

 [ Philippine Standard Geographic Code]
 Bien Unido Profile

Municipalities of Bohol